

Men's events

Women's events

10th
Chinese Games
Gymnastics